Green Oasis Community Garden & Gilbert's Sculpture Garden, also known as Green Oasis Community Garden, is a 17,787 square foot community garden and sculpture garden at 372 East 8th Street, located in the East Village of Manhattan, New York City.

History 
Green Oasis Community Garden was founded in 1981. With the neighborhood experiencing crime and decay in the preceding decades, the garden opened, alongside Gilbert’s Sculpture Garden, aiming to provide a safe, green space for all people, especially children. In addition, the garden created space for the community, offering a space to perform theater, poetry, and enjoy nature. Green Oasis Community Garden, founded by Norman Valee and Reinaldo Aranas, was created from five abandoned lots located on East 8th St between Avenues C & D. With the help of the community, the lots were cleared of rubble, dumped cars, and garbage to prepare for the garden. 

The Green Oasis Community Garden had fight for its survival when the local Community Board did not back its application to be spared from development. In response, the gardener's organized, eventually prevailing with community support.

A community volunteer organization hosts monthly clean-ups at the Green Oasis Community Garden.

Trees and amenities 
The garden's tree specimens include a giant Blue Atlas Cedar, cherry and mulberry trees, and crepe myrtles. In addition, Green Oasis has  bee hives and a koi pond.

In 1987, the movie Batteries Not Included was filmed across the street from the garden. The garden space was used as a staging area. At the conclusion of the movie, the people in the community used the money gained from the rental to purchase the gazebo that still stands there today.

Gilbert’s Sculpture Garden 
John Gilbert Ingram Sr., the superintendent of the building across from Valle and Arenas, created a sculpture garden, seeing the open lot as an ideal spot to fulfill his lifelong interest in sculpting. Gilbert’s Sculpture Garden merged in the 1990s with its neighbor, Green Oasis, to create one of the most child-friendly gardens in NYC.

See also 

 Community Gardens in New York City
 Community gardening in the United States

References

External links 

 Green Oasis - website

Community gardening in New York City
Parks in Manhattan
Sculpture gardens, trails and parks in New York (state)
Alphabet City, Manhattan
East Village, Manhattan
Protected areas established in 1981
1981 establishments in New York City